Kshlau-Yelga (Qışlawyılğa) is a rural locality (a village) in Askinsky District, Bashkortostan, Russia. The population was 345 as of 2010. There are 7 streets.

Geography 
Kshlau-Yelga is located 41 km northwest of Askino (the district's administrative centre) by road. Novye Kazanchi is the nearest rural locality.

References 

Rural localities in Askinsky District